Bharat Bhushan Ashu (born 20 March 1971) is an Indian National Congress politician from Punjab. He is two-time MLA representing the Ludhiana West Assembly constituency and he was Cabinet Minister of Food, Civil Supplies & Consumer Affairs, Government of Punjab.

Political career

Ashu started his political career when he was elected as a Municipal Councillor in the year 1997 from ward number 48 of Ludhiana. looser 54).

In the year 2012, he was allotted a ticket of the Indian National Congress to contest from Ludhiana West Vidhan Sabha constituency and he becomes the Deputy CLP leader in the Punjab Vidhan Sabha.

Again in the year 2017, he defeated Ahbaab Grewal of Aam Aadmi Party with a margin of 36,521 votes.  He was the Cabinet Minister of Food & Civil Supplies and Consumer Affairs, Government of Punjab.

In 2022, he lost the election from Ludhiana West to AAP Candidate Gurpreet Bassi Gogi by more than 7500 votes.

Controversies 

Ashu had been continuously criticised for his bad temper, arrogance and misbehaviour:

In January 2019, Ashu was publicly seen and captured by media while misbehaving with female officer in a public function.

In February 2019, Audio recordings of Ashu threatening and blackmailing the then DSP & Superintending engineer of Improvement trust went viral.

In October 2019, Ashu was blamed for thrashing his own party's volunteer during by-election preparations.

References

1971 births
Living people
People from Ludhiana
Indian National Congress politicians from Punjab, India
Punjab, India MLAs 2017–2022
State cabinet ministers of Punjab, India